The Brian Keith Show (titled The Little People during its first season) is an American sitcom that aired on NBC from September 1972 to March 1974. The series stars Brian Keith and Shelley Fabares.

Synopsis
Keith plays Dr. Sean Jamison, a pediatrician running a free clinic for children in Hawaii. Shelley Fabares stars as his daughter Anne, who also works as pediatrician alongside her father. The first-season supporting cast included Stephen Hague as Alfred Landis and Sean Tyler Hall as Stewart, two neighborhood youngsters. Keith's wife Victoria Young played Nurse Puni. Michael Gray appeared the first season as Ronnie Collins, a student doctor, and Moe Keale played Officer O'Shaughnessy. Keith drove a tiny 1970 Citroën Méhari jeep as his main automobile.

In the fall of 1973, with the series renamed The Brian Keith Show, Gray and Hague left the cast. Nancy Kulp and Roger Bowen joined the series in the roles of wealthy landlady, Mrs. Millard Gruber, and the allergist, Dr. Austin Chaffee.

Cast
 Brian Keith as Dr. Sean Jamison
 Shelley Fabares as Dr. Anne Jamison
 Victoria Young as Nurse Puni
 Nancy Kulp as Mrs. Millard Gruber (second season)
 Roger Bowen as Dr. Austin Chaffee (second season)
Sean Tyler Hall as Stewart

Episodes

Season 1: The Little People (1972–73)

Season 2: The Brian Keith Show (1973–1974)

References

External links
 

1972 American television series debuts
1974 American television series endings
1970s American sitcoms
English-language television shows
NBC original programming
Television shows set in Hawaii
Television series by Warner Bros. Television Studios
Television shows filmed in Hawaii